Inchture Village railway station was a railway station in the village of Inchture, Perthshire, Scotland.

The Inchture Railway Bus service operated a service from its junction at Inchture railway station northwards along a one and a half mile stretch to the village of Inchture. Although operated by the Caledonian Railway (as part of the Dundee and Perth Railway), this was not a railway in the true sense, but a horse-drawn tramway. It began service in 1848 and during its peak ran six return journeys on weekdays, before it eventually closed on 1 January 1917. The building which used to house the tramcar still exists today in the form of a private house, with the outlines of the former garage doors still clearly visible.

Footnotes

Disused railway stations in Perth and Kinross
Tram transport in Scotland
Railway stations in Great Britain opened in 1848
Railway stations in Great Britain closed in 1917
Former Caledonian Railway stations